Kantakunosato Station (干拓の里駅, Kantakunosato-eki) is a train station located in Ono-machi, Isahaya, Nagasaki Prefecture. The station is serviced by Shimabara Railway and is a part of the Shimabara Railway Line.

Lines 
The train station is serving for the Shimabara Railway Line with the local trains and some express train stop at the station.

Adjacent stations 

|-
|colspan=5 style="text-align:center;" |Shimabara Railway

See also 
 List of railway stations in Japan

References

External links 
 

Railway stations in Japan opened in 1995
Railway stations in Nagasaki Prefecture
Stations of Shimabara Railway